Karnaval is a French film directed by Thomas Vincent and was released 3 March 1999. The film was nominated for a César Award for Best Debut in 2000. At the 49th Berlin International Film Festival in 1999 it won the Alfred Bauer Prize, a prize awarded in memory of the festival founder.

Plot
While Dunkirk is in the midst of its Carnival, Larbi, tired of working for nothing for his father, decides to pack it in and re-make his life in the sun of Marseille. When  he is waiting for the first train which is to leave in the early hours of the morning, he makes the acquaintance of Béa (Sylvie Testud), who is with her drunk husband. He is straight away captivated by the young woman and she carries him along with her in her passion for the Carnival.

The film captures well the character and mad ambience of the extraordinary Dunkirk Carnival. The opinions of the Carnival's friends however remain divided. Some find the picture given here of the Dunkirk Carnival too negative, while others appreciate the film, which was shot in the midst of the Carnival.

Cast
 Sylvie Testud as Béa
 Amar Ben Abdallah as Larbi
 Clovis Cornillac as Christian
 Martine Godart as Isabelle
 Jean-Paul Rouve as Pine
 Thierry Bertein as Gigi
 Dominique Baeyens as Doriane
 Hervé Pierre as Verhoeven
 Malek Kateb as Larbis Vater
 Karim Attia as Nasser
 Manon Seys as Emilie

References

External links

1999 films
1999 drama films
French drama films
1990s French-language films
Films directed by Thomas Vincent
Films set in Dunkirk
1990s French films